The 1959 European Rowing Championships were rowing championships held on the Mâcon regatta course on the Saône in Mâcon, France. The event for women was held from 14 to 16 August, and 16 races were held. The event for men was held from 20 to 23 August. Men competed in all seven Olympic boat classes (M1x, M2x, M2-, M2+, M4-, M4+, M8+), and women entered in five boat classes (W1x, W2x, W4x+, W4+, W8+).

Medal summary – women's events

Medal summary – men's events

References

European Rowing Championships
European Rowing Championships
Rowing
Rowing
European